"Thinking 'Bout You" is a song written by American country music singer Dustin Lynch with Andy Albert, Hunter Phelps, and Will Weatherly. It was first recorded by Lynch as a duet with fellow American country singer Lauren Alaina for Lynch's fourth studio album, Tullahoma (2020). Due to promotional conflicts, the song was re-recorded in 2021 featuring Canadian country singer MacKenzie Porter for release as the album's fifth single. The single version with Porter debuted to American country radio on May 3, 2021.

The latter version of the song was also included on Lynch's 2022 album Blue in the Sky as its lead single.

Background
Lynch co-wrote "Thinking 'Bout You" with Andy Albert, Hunter Phelps, and Will Weatherly for his fourth studio album, Tullahoma. The song is structured as a "call-and-response" conversation between ex-partners and represents the first true duet Lynch has recorded. It was originally recorded as a duet between Lynch and Lauren Alaina. When the song was selected as the next single from Tullahoma, Alaina had recently released her latest single (at the time) "Getting Over Him" with Jon Pardi and Alaina's record label had concerns over her having two male-female duets at radio concurrently. As a compromise between the artists, "Thinking 'Bout You" was re-recorded for its single release. Lynch held a blind audition for a new female vocalist and ultimately chose Canadian singer and actress MacKenzie Porter as his new duet partner. The remix with Porter was released to digital retailers and streaming services March 19, 2021, and was serviced to American country radio on May 3, 2021.

Critical reception
Markos Papadatos of Digital Journal praised the combination of Lynch and Porter's voices and described the song as "catchy and worthy of the repeat button." Off the Record UK wrote that the "passionate power duet" featured "heart-pounding hooks and memory-soaked vocals."

Chart performance
"Thinking 'Bout You" became Lynch's eighth number one hit (and Porter's first) on the Billboard Country Airplay chart dated December 11, 2021, and stayed at the top for six consecutive weeks. It is Lynch's longest-running number one on the chart and has spent a record-breaking 28 weeks in the top ten, besting Jason Aldean and Carrie Underwood's "If I Didn't Love You". With a peak of number 30, it is Lynch's highest charting single on the Billboard Hot 100.

Music video
An accompanying music video premiered March 19, 2021, concurrent with the remix's digital release. Directed by Justin Nolan Key, the "cinematic" video builds on the song's conversational tone and features Lynch and Porter as former lovers reminiscing over the phone.

Charts

Weekly charts

Year-end charts

Certifications

Release history

References

Dustin Lynch songs
MacKenzie Porter songs
Lauren Alaina songs
Songs written by Dustin Lynch
Songs written by Andy Albert
2020 songs
2021 singles
BBR Music Group singles
Male–female vocal duets